Juncus maritimus, known as the sea rush, is a species of rush that grows on coastlines. It is sometimes considered conspecific with Juncus kraussii.
It has a wide distribution across the western Palearctic realm (all of Europe, western Asia and the Maghreb).

According to Edward Catich the ancient Egyptians used Juncus maritimus as a brush for writing. He describes the process of making one: “the end of which [the rush] was cut at a slant and its fibers split by chewing to produce a small chisel-shaped ‘brush‘.”.

References

External links

maritimus
Plants described in 1789
Taxa named by Jean-Baptiste Lamarck
Flora of Europe
Flora of Sweden